Take Fountain is the sixth studio album by The Wedding Present. It was released in the UK on 14 February 2005, through Scopitones Records, and a day later in the US through Manifesto Records.

Background
David Gedge originally recorded Take Fountain as the fourth Cinerama album, but after the break-up of his relationship with fellow Cinerama founder Sally Murrell, Gedge decided that this darker record should be released under his Wedding Present name. Take Fountain is the band's first album release since 1996's Saturnalia, and returns to the noisy, jangly, intelligent indie sound of old. 

Take Fountain was recorded in the United States at Robert Lang Studios in Shoreline, Washington, at Philosophy of the World Recording in Seattle, Washington, and at Electrical Audio in Chicago, Illinois in mid-2004. Steve Fisk acted as producer and  engineer, with additional production from Gedge and guitarist Simon Cleave. Justin Armstrong and Greg Man did additional engineering.

Charts
The album reached number 68 in the UK chart, after all of Cinerama's albums had failed to chart other than the debut which only reached number 93.

Title
In Los Angeles, Fountain Avenue is a minor east-west street, between and parallel to Sunset Boulevard and Santa Monica Boulevard, two very congested arteries. According to a common tale, Bette Davis was once asked what the best way an aspiring starlet could get into Hollywood was, and reportedly replied without hesitation, "Take Fountain!"

Track listing
All the songs were written by David Gedge and Simon Cleave.

 "On Ramp" – 2:03
 "Interstate 5" (extended version) – 8:06
 "Always the Quiet One" – 3:20
 "I'm from Further North Than You" – 3:39
 "Mars Sparkles Down on Me" – 4:14
 "Ringway to Seatac" – 2:41
 "Don't Touch That Dial" (Pacific Northwest version) – 6:18
 "It's for You" – 3:16
 "Larry's" – 3:39
 "Queen Anne" – 4:05
 "Perfect Blue" – 5:31

Personnel
Personnel per booklet.

The Wedding Present
 David Gedge – vocals, guitar, percussion, orchestral arrangements
 Simon Cleave – guitar
 Terry de Castro – bass, backing vocals
 Kari Paavola – drums, percussion

Additional musicians
 Steve Fisk – vibraphone, glockenspiel, mellotron, organ, piano
 Jen Kozel – violin
 Stephen Cresswell – viola
 Lori Goldston – cello
 Don Crevie – French horn
 Jeff McGrath – trumpet

Production and design
 Steve Fisk – producer, engineer, mixing
 David Gedge – additional production
 Simon Cleave – additional production
 Justin Armstrong – additional engineering
 Greg Norman – additional engineering
 Noel Summervile – mastered
 Hak Bo Lee – piano technician
 Egelnick and Webb – sleeve design
 Lincoln Carmen Mongillo III – photography

References

2005 albums
The Wedding Present albums
Albums produced by Steve Fisk
Albums recorded at Robert Lang Studios